(also written 2011 ES4) is an Apollo near-Earth asteroid roughly  in diameter. It passed closest approach to Earth on 13 March 2011. Before the 2020 approach, the asteroid had a short observation arc of 4 days and had not been observed since March 2011. The asteroid was expected to pass within 1 lunar distance of Earth in early September 2020, but did not.

 was recovered as P1154IU on 5 September 2020 at apparent magnitude 18. It passed  from Earth on 2 September 2020. With the observation arc being extended to 9 years, it was removed from the Sentry Risk Table on 6 September 2020.

2019 
NEODyS and JPL Horizons show the asteroid came to opposition (opposite the Sun in the sky) around 8–13 December 2019 at around apparent magnitude 24.8. (Magnitude 24.8 is about 30 times fainter than the more common magnitude 21 detected by automated Near-Earth object surveys.) During opposition, the uncertainty in the asteroid's sky position covered about 3.8 degrees of the sky.

2020 
On 2 September 2020 the asteroid passed  from Earth and was recovered as P1154IU at apparent magnitude 18 on 5 September 2020.

Prior to its recovery in 2020,  had a short 4-day observation arc. It could have been around magnitude 22–24 with recovery efforts challenged by the brightness of a 2 September full Moon. Opposition from the Sun did not occur until mid-September. JPL Horizons predicted the asteroid to be hidden in the Sun's glare until hours before closest approach. NEODyS did not expect the asteroid to be more than 50 degrees from the Sun until 30 August.

2055 
With a 9-year observation arc it is known that the asteroid will be  from Earth on 2 September 2055 (with an uncertainty of ±10 thousand km) and therefore there is no risk of an impact. When there was only a short 4-day observation arc, the Sentry Risk Table showed an estimated 1 in 67000 chance of the asteroid impacting Earth on 2 September 2055. (Due to the short 4-day observation arc, between 2011 and 2055 the uncertainty region grew to wrap around the entire orbit so the asteroid could be anywhere on any of the numerous orbit fits.)

With a diameter between the 20-meter Chelyabinsk meteor and the 50-meter Tunguska event, 2011 ES4 has the potential to do structural damage to a city since asteroids around a diameter of 40 meters can cause wood-frame buildings to collapse. However, as there are numerous variables, the actual effect of an impact might be similar to the smaller of these two events with widespread injuries and damage to buildings if it occurred over a populated area. At 25 meters in diameter it would be a blast equivalent to the high altitude air detonation of a nuclear weapon of around half a megaton yield.

2121 

Notes

References

External links 
 
 
 

Minor planet object articles (unnumbered)
Discoveries by MLS
Near-Earth objects removed from the Sentry Risk Table
20200902
20110302